Sasha Jeaneth Fábrega Bosquez (born 23 October 1990) is a Panamanian footballer who plays as a goalkeeper for Tauro and the Panama women's national team.

Career
Fábrega has appeared for the Panama women's national team, including in the 2020 CONCACAF Women's Olympic Qualifying Championship on 31 January 2020 against the United States, coming on as a substitute in the 33rd minute for the injured Yenith Bailey.

See also
 List of Panama women's international footballers

References

External links
 

1990 births
Living people
People from Santiago District, Veraguas
Panamanian women's footballers
Women's association football goalkeepers
Panama women's international footballers
Pan American Games competitors for Panama
Footballers at the 2019 Pan American Games